Nicholas S. Daniloff (born December 30, 1934) is an American journalist who graduated from Harvard University and was most prominent in the 1980s for his reporting on the Soviet Union. Being a Moscow correspondent for a U.S. magazine, Daniloff came to wider international attention on September 2, 1986, after he was arrested in Moscow by the KGB and accused of espionage. On September 7, 1986, Daniloff was notified of a charge and had a proceeding scheduled for 2 pm at Lefortovo Prison in Moscow. No other information was known at the time about what happened during the proceedings.

The Reagan administration took the position that the Soviets had arrested Daniloff without cause, in retaliation for the arrest three days earlier of Gennadi Zakharov, an employee of the Soviet UN Mission. The Soviets initially contended that Daniloff had confidential government documents on him when he was arrested.

After intense discussion between the governments, on September 23 Daniloff was allowed to leave the Soviet Union without charges, Zakharov was allowed to leave the U.S. after pleading nolo contendere, and Soviet dissident Yuri Orlov was released to the West.

However, the diplomatic crisis did not end there. Expulsions of diplomats and suspected spies escalated to the point that by the end of October 1986, 100 Soviets, including a further 80 suspected Soviet intelligence agents, were expelled by the U.S. The Soviets expelled ten U.S. diplomats and withdrew all 260 of the Russian support staff working for the U.S. embassy in Moscow.

Daniloff later contended in his autobiography, Two Lives, One Russia, that he had never held classified documents, and that the KGB had created false information. Daniloff became an instructor at Northeastern University's School of Journalism, and in 1992 he was named director of the school. He was also one of the co-authors of the book The Oath, a biography of Khassan Baiev.

Daniloff's grandfather, general Yuri Danilov, was a chief of operations of Russian Imperial Army general-headquarters during World War I.

See also
 Paul Whelan (security director)

References 

American male journalists
Journalism teachers
Harvard University alumni
Northeastern University faculty
American people imprisoned in the Soviet Union
1934 births
Living people
Place of birth missing (living people)
American expatriates in the Soviet Union
American people of Russian descent